Lincoln County is a county located in the east central portion of the U.S. state of Georgia. As of the 2020 census, the population was 7,690. The county seat is Lincolnton. The county was created on February 20, 1796.

Lincoln County is included in the Augusta-Richmond County, GA-SC Metropolitan Statistical Area, the Savannah River forming its northeastern border. Located above the fall line, it is part of the Central Savannah River Area (CSRA) and a member of the CSRA Regional Development Center.

History
On February 20, 1796, Lincoln County was established as the twenty-fourth county in the state of Georgia. Before then, its territory was part of Wilkes County, now on its western side. The new county was named after General Benjamin Lincoln (1733-1810), a Revolutionary War hero notable for receiving Gen. Cornwallis's sword at Yorktown, Virginia.

On January 22, 1852, the legislature changed the location of the line between Wilkes County and Lincoln County, although there is no extant record as to why the legislature made the change.

From before the American Revolutionary War until the 1950s, Lincoln County was primarily a farming and agricultural area. The development and creation of Clarks Hill Dam created a large reservoir that covered portions of Lincoln and nearby counties.  Developers have created many residential neighborhoods and subdivisions in areas near the lake.

Geography
The county is located in the Piedmont region of the state just above the fall line of the eastern United States.

The bulk of Lincoln County, from just south of Lincolnton heading north, is located in the Upper Savannah River sub-basin of the Savannah River basin, with the exception of a tiny sliver of the northernmost section of the county, which is located in the Broad River sub-basin of the larger Savannah River basin.  The southern portion of the county is located in the Little River sub-basin of the same Savannah River basin.

Major highways
  U.S. Route 378
  State Route 43
  State Route 43 Connector
  State Route 44
  State Route 47
  State Route 79
  State Route 220

Adjacent counties
 Elbert County, Georgia - north
 McCormick County, South Carolina - northeast
 Columbia County, Georgia - south
 McDuffie County, Georgia - southwest
 Wilkes County, Georgia - west

Demographics

2000 census
As of the census of 2000, there were 8,348 people, 3,251 households, and 2,379 families living in the county.  The population density was 40 people per square mile (15/km2).  There were 4,514 housing units at an average density of 21 per square mile (8/km2).  The racial makeup of the county was 64.25% White, 34.37% Black or African American, 0.37% Native American, 0.16% Asian, 0.05% Pacific Islander, 0.24% from other races, and 0.56% from two or more races.  0.97% of the population were Hispanic or Latino of any race.

There were 3,251 households, out of which 30.60% had children under the age of 18 living with them, 53.20% were married couples living together, 15.50% had a female householder with no husband present, and 26.80% were non-families. 23.70% of all households were made up of individuals, and 10.40% had someone living alone who was 65 years of age or older.  The average household size was 2.55 and the average family size was 3.01.

In the county, the population was spread out, with 24.40% under the age of 18, 7.20% from 18 to 24, 27.50% from 25 to 44, 26.30% from 45 to 64, and 14.60% who were 65 years of age or older.  The median age was 39 years. For every 100 females there were 94.90 males.  For every 100 females age 18 and over, there were 91.90 males.

The median income for a household in the county was $31,952, and the median income for a family was $36,657. Males had a median income of $27,165 versus $21,338 for females. The per capita income for the county was $15,351.  About 12.40% of families and 15.30% of the population were below the poverty line, including 19.60% of those under age 18 and 15.90% of those age 65 or over.

2010 census
As of the 2010 United States Census, there were 7,996 people, 3,281 households, and 2,252 families living in the county. The racial makeup of the county was 65.7% white, 32.1% black or African American, 0.4% Asian, 0.4% American Indian, 0.4% from other races, and 0.9% from two or more races. Those of Hispanic or Latino origin made up 1.2% of the population. In terms of ancestry, 24.8% were American, 8.4% were English, and 6.3% were German.

Of the 3,281 households, 28.5% had children under the age of 18 living with them, 50.3% were married couples living together, 14.2% had a female householder with no husband present, 31.4% were non-families, and 27.6% of all households were made up of individuals. The average household size was 2.42 and the average family size was 2.94. The median age was 45.0 years.

The median income for a household in the county was $36,399 and the median income for a family was $43,872. Males had a median income of $38,200 versus $24,577 for females. The per capita income for the county was $19,627. About 23.2% of families and 26.3% of the population were below the poverty line, including 41.2% of those under age 18 and 28.5% of those age 65 or over.

2020 census

As of the 2020 United States Census, there were 7,690 people, 3,475 households, and 2,142 families residing in the county.

Recreation and historical sites
Since the creation of Clarks Hill Lake, recreation has contributed to Lincoln County's growth. It is a main destination for tourists, providing fishing, boating, and other water sport opportunities for visitors and nearby residents.

Toward the eastern part of Lincoln County, just before the South Carolina line, is Elijah Clarke State Park. In May of every year, Elijah Clarke holds a bluegrass festival which has become a major attraction in the last 20 years. Several well-known bluegrass musicians play at this event each year, including Lincoln County natives, The Lewis Family. Also held annually at Elijah Clarke is an Arts and Crafts Festival and a Log Cabin Christmas.

There are many historic places to visit in Lincoln County. They include:
 Lamar-Blanchard House, Lincolnton, which is on the National Register of Historic Places
 The Lincoln County Historical Park
 Graves Mountain

Economy
Economic growth has been associated with development of the J. Strom Thurmond Dam and Clarks Hill Lake. In Lincoln County, logging is a multimillion-dollar industry. More than 20 logging businesses produce most of the jobs for Lincoln County residents. The county has attracted new companies, such as Hero Metal, LLC; Top Grill, LLC; and Charles Owen, Inc.

Communities
 Chennault
 Lincolnton

Notable people
 Garrison Hearst- Former NFL player, pro bowler, comeback player in 1995 and 2001
 Barney Bussey - Former NFL player, played for the Cincinnati Bengals and then the Tampa Bay Buccaneers
 The Lewis Family - family bluegrass and gospel band, in 1992 they were inducted into Georgia Music Hall of Fame
 Tom Nash - NFL player for the Green Bay Packers and Brooklyn Dodgers

Politics

See also

 Central Savannah River Area
 National Register of Historic Places listings in Lincoln County, Georgia
List of counties in Georgia

References

Further reading
 Perryman, Clinton J. History of Lincoln County, Georgia, Tignall, GA: 1985

External links
 "Lincoln County Red Devils"
 "Biography", The Lewis Family Singers Website
  Jeff & Sheri Easter

 Lincoln County Georgia Government
 Georgia Historic Commission Markers in Lincoln County

 
Georgia (U.S. state) counties
1796 establishments in Georgia (U.S. state)
Populated places established in 1796